Characium marinum is a species of green algae (Chlorophyta).

Description
Characium marinum is a microscopic unicellular elongated oval algae growing attached epiphytically by a stalk various algae. The single chloroplast is parietal with a single pyrenoid.

Ecology
Epiphytic on other marine algae. and eastern Canada

Distribution
Recorded from Svalbard (Norway), Sweden, once in Ireland County Down, twice in Great Britain, under-recorded. and eastern Canada.

References

External links
Characium marinum, AlgaeBase

Sphaeropleales
Plants described in 1883